"Timmy and the Lords of the Underworld" is a self-titled single released on September 9, 2000 by the creators of South Park featured in the episode "Timmy 2000". The song appears in the music video game Rock Band as a playable track and is exportable for play in later games in the series. In September 2015, it was named the 38th best fictional song of all time by Spin.

Background 
The single was originally from the episode Timmy 2000. Handicapped Timmy Burch forms his own band after being excused from homework due to ADD.

Tracks and personnel 
There are two sides of the record:A list of personnel who performed in the song:

 Bass, Vocals – Matt Stone, co-creator of South Park
 Timmy – Trey Parker, co-creator of South Park
 Drums – Curt Bisquera, studio drummer
 Engineer – Joe Schiff
 Executive Producer – Matt Stone, Trey Parker
 Guitar – Bruce Howell
 Keyboards – D. A. Young
 Mastered By – Dave Mitson
 Mixed By – Bruce Howell, Joe Schiff
 Performer – Trey Parker
 Producer – Bruce Howell
 Written-By – Bruce Howell, Trey Parker

Reception 
The song quickly became popular in the video game Rock Band, as a bonus song.

IGN also highlighted the song when mentioning each of the bonus songs in the game.

Rate Your Music gave the album 3.12 stars.

Spin magazine labeled the song as the 38th best fictional song of all time.

Copyright 
The song shares copyright between Sony Music Entertainment and Comedy Central. However, it was published by Hilarity Music Inc.

References

External links
 
 Discogs.com – Timmy and the Lords of the Underworld

2000 singles
South Park songs
2000 songs
Sony Music singles
Songs from television series